Euphony is the 18th album released by the jazz fusion group Casiopea in 1988.

Track listing

Re-released in 2009 with "Halle" (live version) added to the track listing.

Personnel
CASIOPEA are
Issei Noro - Electric guitar (YAMAHA ISSEI MODEL, G10 Guitar MIDI Controller with TX802 & D-50, RX-5), Acoustic guitar (D'AGOSTINO GUITAR)
Minoru Mukaiya - Keyboards (YAMAHA KX-88, DX-7, TX-816, TX-16W,  QX-3, RX-5, EMULATOR II, KORG DSM-1, Acoustic Piano, ROLAND D-50 & D-550, DYNACORD ADD-one, OBERHEIM EXPANDER)
Tetsuo Sakurai - Electric Bass  (YAMAHA BB-5000 & 5000 W/PIEZO PICK UP. STUD Bass, BB-3000 fretless)
Akira Jimbo - Drums (YAMAHA YD-9000 & 6000 Series, ZILDJAN CYMBALS &  Hooper Drum)

Production 
 Producer - Issei Noro, Shunsuke Miyazumi
 Executive producer - Katsuki Hagiwara, Shinichi Toyama
 Director - Koichi Nakagawa
 Recording & Mixing Engineer - Koji Sugimori
 Mixing engineer - Mitsuharu Kobayashi
 Digital Editing Engineer - Kazumi Sugiura
 Assistant Engineers - Hiroyuki Shimura, Yuji Kuraishi, Masashi Kudo

 Production management - Masato Arai
 Management - Fumiaki Takahashi, Katsuhiro Maruichi, Hisashi Aratake
 Equipment Co-Ordinator - Hideji "Mahka" Uekusa

 Art Director - Masami Akiyama
 Photograph - Osamu Yabushita
 Stylist - Reiko Ohishi
 Hair & Make - Tadamichi Hiwatashi
 Visual Supervisor - Masahiro Tomioka

Release history

External links

References

1988 albums
Casiopea albums